Bitterfeld-Wolfen is a town in the district Anhalt-Bitterfeld, Saxony-Anhalt, Germany. It is situated in south-eastern Saxony-Anhalt, west of the river Mulde, in an area that is dominated by heavy industry and lignite mining. The town was formed by merger of the towns Bitterfeld and Wolfen and the municipalities Greppin, Holzweißig and Thalheim on 1 July 2007.

Geography
Eastward lies the Muldestausee lake, southward the Goitzsche lake with docks, and westwards the lido of Sandersdorf. The town lies in a nature preserve, Bitterfelder Bergbaurevier.

Neighbouring municipalities
Adjoining municipalities are from the north and clockwise Raguhn-Jeßnitz, Muldestausee, Delitzsch, Sandersdorf-Brehna and Zörbig.

Climate

History

Town fusion
On 1 July 2007 the independent towns Wolfen and Bitterfeld and the municipalities Greppin, Thalheim and Holzweißig were merged to form the present-day town of Bitterfeld-Wolfen. Bobbau was absorbed in September 2009.

Historical Population 
(of the present-day town)

¹ Census results
² 2011 Census
³ Source: Bitterfeld-Wolfen Town Hall

Source: Statistisches Landesamt Sachsen-Anhalt

Bitterfeld

Bitterfeld has approximately 15,000 inhabitants (2006). It was first mentioned in 1224. Part of the Electorate of Saxony, it came to the Prussian Province of Saxony in 1815. Until the administrative reform of 2007, it was the capital of the district of Bitterfeld.

Wolfen

Wolfen has approximately 24,000 inhabitants (2006). It is located north of Bitterfeld. Wolfen was first mentioned around 1400. The discovery of lignite in 1846, and the construction of an Agfa dye factory in 1895 brought industry and population growth.

Twin towns – sister cities

Bitterfeld-Wolfen is twinned with:

 Vierzon, France (1959)
 Villefontaine, France (1990)
 Witten, Germany (1994)
 Dzerzhinsk, Russia (1996)
 Kamienna Góra, Poland (2006)
 Marl, Germany (2007)

See also
Bitterfeld-Wolfen (Verwaltungsgemeinschaft)

References

Anhalt-Bitterfeld